Mark Deming (born 1960 in Jackson, Michigan) is an American music and film critic, journalist, and occasional musician. He has worked at All Media Guide since 1999, reviewing both music and movies. He received his B.A. in journalism from Michigan State University. In 1978, he landed a supporting role in the Robert Altman film A Wedding. In 1980, Deming played the character of Lobster Newberg in the cult film Gorp.

In the late 1980s Deming sang lead vocals for The Lime Giants, a Lansing-based alt rock combo. In 1989, the band released the album At Home with the Lime Giants.

Filmography

References

1960 births
Living people
People from Jackson, Michigan
American music critics
American film critics
Michigan State University alumni